Riisu is Finnish industrial metal band Ruoska's second album; it was released on 9 September 2003. There were no music videos for this album.

Track listing
Elon tiellä ('On Life's Road') – 3:18
Puhe ('Speech') – 3:57
Darmstadt – 3:32
Kuka luopuisi kuolemastaan ('Who Would Abandon Death') – 3:41
Synkät soinnut, rujot riimit ('Dark Chords, Ugly Rhymes') – 3:22
Riisu ('Disrobe') – 3:56
Työmiehen haudalla ('On Worker's Grave') – 4:46
Rauta valittaa ('Iron Laments') – 4:00
Airut ('Herald') – 3:50
Maailmanlopun pyörä ('The Wheel of the End of the World') – 2:55
Piruparka ('Poor Sod') – 4:48

Band members
During the album recording, these were the band members:
Patrik Mennander (vocals)
Anssi Auvinen (guitar)
Kai Ahvenranta (guitar)
Mika Kamppi (bass)
Sami Karppinen (drums)

References
 Discography at Ruoska official website

External links
English fansite

Ruoska albums
2003 albums